Erik Christensen (born January 28, 1938) is a Danish sprint canoer who competed in the early 1960s. He finished ninth in the C-1 1000 m event at the 1960 Summer Olympics in Rome.

References
Sports-reference.com profile

External links

1938 births
Canoeists at the 1960 Summer Olympics
Danish male canoeists
Living people
Olympic canoeists of Denmark
Place of birth missing (living people)